Quebecor Inc. is a Canadian diversified media and telecommunications company serving Québec based in Montreal. It was spelled Quebecor in both English and French until May 2012, when shareholders voted to add the acute accent, Québecor, in French only.

The company was founded in 1965 by Pierre Péladeau and remains run by his family. Quebecor Inc. owns Quebecor Media and formerly owned the printing company Quebecor World.

Assets

Telecommunications
Vidéotron
illico TV (channel 900)
illico Digital TV (Cable TV provider)
Club illico (SVOD service)
Vrai (unscripted SVOD service)
Helix TV app
Canal Indigo (pay-per-view and NVOD channel; bilingual with English- and French-language services)
Fizz (internet and cellular provider)
Vidéotron Business
Fibrenoire
MAtv (community channels)
Helix (internet and IPTV provider)
Le SuperClub Vidéotron (video rental chain)
Microplay (video game retail)
SETTE Postproduction
 VMedia (Toronto, Ontario)

Media
Groupe TVA
TVA
 CFTM-DT Montréal
 CFCM-DT Québec City
 CHLT-DT Sherbrooke
 CHEM-DT Trois-Rivières
 CJPM-DT Saguenay
 CFER-TV Rimouski
addikTV
Casa
Prise 2
Yoopa
MOI&cie
Évasion
Zeste
TVA Sports
TVA+ (video on demand and catch-up TV)
TVA Publications (magazines)
7 Jours
TV Hebdo
Recettes du Québec
Échos Vedettes
Cool!
Clin d'œil
Star Système
Coup de Pouce
Canadian Living
Espaces
Échos Vedettes
DH
Les Idées de ma maison
Style at Home
Dernière Heure
Good Times Magazine
La Semaine
La Semaine Pratique
La Semaine Santé
La Semaine Extra
La Semaine Téléromans
La Semaine Cuisine
Pool Pro
Messageries Dynamiques (distribution)
MELS Studios (film and television production services)
Incendo Media
TVA Films (theatrical film and home video distribution)
TVA Nouvelles (news source)
Le Canal Nouvelles (LCN)
Quebecor Content (television content production)
Le Journal de Montréal (Montréal newspaper)
Le Journal de Québec (Québec City newspaper)
24 Heures (free newspaper)
J5 mobile app
QUB Radio (online radio and podcast platform)
QUB Musique (music streaming platform)
NumériQ
Billie
En 5 minutes
Le Sac de chips
Pèse sur Start
Porte-monnaie
Silo 57
TABLOÏD
Le Guide de l’auto
Groupe Livre Québecor Média (book publishing)
Groupe Sogides (general literature)
Groupe Homme
Les Éditions de l'Homme
Le Jour Éditeur 
Les Éditions La Griffe
Les Éditions Petit Homme
Juniper Publishing (English-language publishing)
Groupe Charron Éditeur
Éditions La Semaine
Recto-Verso Éditeur 
Groupe Ville-Marie Littérature
Éditions VLB
Éditions de l'Hexagone
Les Éditions du Journal
Éditions TYPO
Les Éditions de La Bagnole
Groupe Librex
Éditions Libre Expression
Éditions Stanké
Les Éditions Publistar
Éditions Trécarré
Éditions Logiques
Les Éditions CEC (school books)
Messageries ADP (distribution)
Quebecor Advertising Sales & Marketing
Quebecor Out of Home
Mirabel Printing (newspaper printing)
Agence QMI (press agency)

Sports and entertainment
Videotron Centre (indoor arena)
Les Disques Musicor (record label)
Audiogram (record label)
Éditorial Avenue (music publishing)
Gestev (events management)
Blainville-Boisbriand Armada
Quebec Remparts

Sponsorship

The company began a push towards sports: it acquired the naming rights and a management contract for the Videotron Centre, currently owns the Quebec Remparts of the QMJHL, has backed a proposed National Hockey League expansion franchise in Quebec City (which would bring the NHL back to the city for the first time since the Quebec Nordiques were relocated in 1995, and would play at the new arena), and launched a TVA-branded sports network in 2011.

On 20 July 2015, Quebecor officially submitted its application for an NHL expansion team in Quebec City. The application has since passed two phases of league scrutiny, with a final decision expected in early 2016.

Corporate governance
Former Prime Minister of Canada Brian Mulroney serves as chair of the board.

Current members of the board of directors of Quebecor Inc. are: Françoise Bertrand, Jean La Couture, Sylvie Lalande, Pierre Laurin, A. Michel Lavigne, Geneviève Marcon, Brian Mulroney, and Normand Provost.

See also
Media ownership in Canada
Charles-Albert Poissant

References

External links
 Official website
 Assets as of 2010 

 
Companies listed on the Toronto Stock Exchange
Conglomerate companies of Canada
Mass media companies established in 1965
1965 establishments in Quebec
Quebec sovereigntist media